Mazhai  is a 2005 Indian Tamil-language romantic action film directed by Rajkumar. It is a remake of the 2004 Telugu film Varsham, and stars Jayam Ravi and Shriya, while Vadivelu, Rahul Dev, and Kalabhavan Mani play supporting roles. The film's music is composed by Devi Sri Prasad. The film gained overall positive reviews from both critics and audience.

Plot
Arjun (Jayam Ravi), an unemployed youngster, and Deva (Rahul Dev), a powerful don, both fall in love with Sailaja (Shriya), a middle-class beauty, at the same time on a rainy day at a railway station. Arjun keeps bumping into Sailaja coincidentally every time it rains. This makes them both feel that it is the rain that keeps bringing them together, and they start to fall in love. Deva takes the backdoor route to get Sailaja, with the help of her good-for-nothing father, Sundaramoorthy (Kalabhavan Mani). After learning of Arjun and Sailaja's love, Deva and Sundaramoorthy work up devious plans to break them up. They soon succeeded in creating a rift between the two lovers. Though Arjun realizes what is really happening, Sailaja falls prey to Deva and her father's foils. The young lovers part ways; Sailaja becomes a leading lady in the movies, and Arjun works with his uncle (Rajesh) in a quarry as a demolition expert. Deva is cheated out of some money by Sundaramoorthy, and he finds out where Sailaja lives and kidnaps her. Sundaramoorthy realizes that the only person who is daring enough and cares enough to get his daughter back is Arjun and goes to him with his pleas. It takes much convincing, but Arjun decides to rescue Sailaja but for reasons other than love. At this point, Sailaja begins to realize that her father lied to her and tries to get back with Arjun, but he refuses because she did not trust him. Sailaja convinces Arjun that it was not her fault, and they both start loving again. The climax is a heroic fight between Arjun and Deva, in which Arjun is the victor. In the end, Arjun unites with Shailaja.

Cast

Soundtrack
The soundtrack features six songs composed by Devi Sri Prasad, retaining the tunes from the original version except for "Kuchi Karuvadu", which is based on "Kandhi Chenu Kada" from Naa Alludu (2005). It got rave reviews for songs and background score.

Critical reception
Behindwoods wrote: "Although the story is familiar, the screenplay is different which makes it appealing". Indiaglitz wrote, "All said, Mazhai, produced by S P B Charan, is sure to enthrall the audience especially youngsters". Sify wrote "At best, Mazhai is a passable time pass fare if you don't care for logic and reason".

References

External links
 

2005 films
Tamil remakes of Telugu films
2000s Tamil-language films
2000s romantic action films
Indian romantic action films